Matilda of Vianden (also spelled Mathilda or Mathilde) may refer to:

 Matilda of Vianden, wife of Frederic III, Count of Vianden (de)
 Matilda of Vianden (de), daughter of Frederic III of Vianden; sister of Henry I, Count of Vianden
 Matilda of Vianden (-after 1255), daughter of Henry I of Vianden; wife of John Angelos of Syrmia

See also
 Matilda (disambiguation)
 Counts of Vianden
 Matilda (name)